United Sports Club (formerly known as both Prayag United, and Chirag United) is an Indian professional football club based in Kolkata, West Bengal. Founded as Eveready Association in 1927, the club competes in the Calcutta Premier Division A, the highest division of Asia's oldest league CFL. As one of the successful teams from the state, United Sports participated in I-League, which was then top flight of Indian football league system. It is also nominated for I-League 2.

History

1927–2009
United SC was originally established in 1927 as Eveready Association Club. Since then, they participated in fewer editions of the Calcutta Football League. The club has a tradition of bringing up local and unknown talents from various parts of Bengal. In 2003, they lifted their first trophy All Airlines Gold Cup, defeating Mohun Bagan A.C. 2–1. In 2004, they emerged victorious in the Sikkim Governor's Gold Cup, defeating ANFA XI 4–2 in penalty-shootout. During the 2005–06 season, they participated in Kalinga Cup in Odisha and reached the final, defeating Bangladeshi side Bada Jagarani Sangsad by 4–2. They clinched the title defeating Cuttack SSH 2–0. Eveready Association also reached the final of the 111th edition of IFA Shield but lost 1–5 to Bayern Munich II at the end.

In 2006, the club was renamed as United Sports Club to attract a title sponsor and the football division owned by United Sport Football Team Private Ltd. Later, veteran manager Amal Dutta was roped in as head coach in place of Belgian Philippe De Ridder. With the inflow of sponsorship, the club clinched promotion to the first division of the I-League in 2007. Previously the club has competed in the National Football League (India) before joining the newly formed I-League.

2010–present

Prayag United participated in the 123rd edition of the Durand Cup in 2010. United emerged champion at the Ambedkar Stadium with a 1–0 tie-break win over JCT FC. For the 2010–11 I-League season, United SC played at the Salt Lake Stadium in Kolkata. On Indian Transfer deadline day United SC made headline news by signing India national football team striker Sunil Chhetri until the end of the season. On 3 April 2011, Chhetri scored his first goal for Chirag United against Dempo, however, Dempo won the match 4–2. Chhetri then scored a brace on 29 April 2011 against ONGC to help salvage a 2–2 draw for Chirag. In June 2011 after the I-League season ended, old sponsors Chirag chose to cut ties with United SC and thus Chirag United SC became Prayag United Sports Club. Even though the team has lost a lot in terms of sponsorship money the club is still able to sign and retain their current players.

On 3 August 2011, it was announced that United Sports Club had signed a sponsorship deal with Prayag Group and on 7 August 2011 United Sports Club officially changed their name to Prayag United SC. In October, the club narrowly missed the opportunity of winning the Durand Cup, after a 5–4 defeat to Churchill Brothers. The association, however was cancelled in the summer of the 2013, when the company found itself involved in the chit-fund scam. The name was again changed to United Sports Club.

In November 2012, Dutchman Eelco Schattorie was roped in by the club as their new manager and he managed his first game in India on 10 November 2012, where he led Prayag to a 10–1 victory over newly promoted United Sikkim. Schattorie won his first and only cup for the side on 20 March 2013 when Prayag United defeated East Bengal in the IFA Shield final 1–0 through a Ranti Martins goal. The following season in the I-League, They thrashed Air India FC by 5–1 margin, and eventually finished the 2012–13 campaign leading Prayag United to a fourth-place finish with 44 points. In that season, they emerged as the runners-up of the 2012 IFA Shield, losing to East Bengal by 4–2 on penalties.

In 2013, the club won their maiden IFA Shield title by defeating East Bengal FC in the final by 1–0 margin. In that competition (Semi-finals), they also defeated a foreign side Deportivo Saprissa of Costa Rica. After the end of 2013–14 I-League season, United finished on tenth position with 26 points in 24 matches and was evicted from I-League for not fulfilling the Asian Football Confederation's club licensing criteria.

On 24 July 2015, it was announced that the club appointed Bino George as the new head coach. United emerged as champions in the 2019–20 Calcutta Premier Division B with 28 points in 14 matches and earned promotion to Division A. In that season, United reached to the semi-finals of the 2020 IFA Shield but lost to George Telegraph SC by 2–1.

Crest

The club crest is designed in the shape of a blue and white circle, that includes words United Sports Club in the blue strip. This is to show United Sports Club as the main name of the club. Inside the crest, there is a Peafowl on top of a football.

Colours
While the crest is blue and white, the official colours of United SC are purple and yellow. While still sponsored and owned by Chirag Computers, United Sports Club's official colours were purple and white. The home kit for United SC includes a purple and yellow jersey with purple shorts and white socks while the away kit is all white with red socks.

Ownership
Originally established in 1927 as the Everready Association, the club was renamed as the United Sports Club in 2006, following financial backing by Chirag Computers, a subsidiary of RP Group Company. With the inflow of sponsorship thereafter, the club clinched promotion to the first division of the I-League in 2008.

Mr. Alokesh Kundu and Mr. Siddhartha Bhattacharya are the General Secretary and the Director of  United Sports Club respectively.

Kit manufacturers and shirt sponsors

Stadium

United Sports Club currently plays at the 20,000 seating Kalyani Municipal Corporation Stadium in Kalyani. Though the officials initially said that club would move to Siliguri, they have decided to stay in Kalyani for the 2013–14 season and continued there.

Previously, the club used the iconic 85,000 seater Salt Lake Stadium in Kolkata for their home matches of the I-League and Calcutta Football League.

Players

First-team squad

Notable players

World Cup player

Foreign players
  Yusif Yakubu (2011–2012)
  Eric Brown (2013–2015)
  Kayne Vincent (2011–2013)
  Eugene Gray (2003–2006)
  Edmilson Marques Pardal (2009–2010)
  Hasan Al Moustafa (2013–2014)
  Ranti Martins (2012–2014)
  Junior Obagbemiro (2010–2011)
  Isaac Boakye (2013)
  Ian Nekati (2022–)

Honours

League

 I-League 2nd Division
Third place (1): 2008 (as Chirag United)
Calcutta Football League
Runners-up (1): 2009
Third place (1): 2007
Calcutta Premier Division B
Champions (1): 2019–20

Cup
 Durand CupChampions (1): 2010
Runners-up (1): 2011
 IFA ShieldChampions (2): 2013, 2015 (as U-19 team)
Runners-up (2): 2005 (as Eveready Association), 2012
 All Airlines Gold CupChampions (1): 2003 (as Eveready Association)Sikkim Governor's Gold CupChampions (1): 2004 (as Eveready Association)
 Kalinga CupChampions (1): 2005
 Trades CupChampions (1): 2007
Runners-up (1): 2006
 Amta Sanhati Gold CupChampions (1): 2015Naihati Gold CupRunners-up (1): 2022Madhyamgram MLA Cup'Runners-up (1): 2022–23

Team records

United SC youth
In 2013, United SC launched it's U20 team to participate in the Elite League (India) as Prayag United U20 and competed in the 2013 I-League U20. The club's U19 team was formed in 2010 and competed in the 2010 I-League U19. They later participated in the league during the 2014–15 I-League U19 season from group A – Kolkata'' zone and moved to final round.

Honours
IFA Shield: 2015

See also

 Football in Kolkata
 List of football clubs in Kolkata
 List of football clubs in India

Notes

References

Further reading

External links
United SC at Soccerway

United SC at Global Sports Archive

 
Association football clubs established in 1927
Football clubs in Kolkata
I-League clubs
1927 establishments in India
I-League 2nd Division clubs